Testosterone sulfate is an endogenous, naturally occurring steroid and minor urinary metabolite of testosterone.

See also
 Androstanediol glucuronide
 Androsterone glucuronide
 Etiocholanolone glucuronide
 Testosterone glucuronide

References

Abandoned drugs
Androstanes
Human metabolites
Sulfate esters
Testosterone esters